Lisa Sharon Chedekel (November 19, 1960 - January 12, 2018) was an American investigative journalist.

Life and career
Chedekel graduated from Wesleyan University in 1982. She attended Phillips Academy in her hometown, Andover, Massachusetts.

At the Hartford Courant in 1998 she was on a team  that provided "clear and detailed coverage of a shooting rampage in which a state lottery worker killed four supervisors, then himself," and won next year's Pulitzer Prize for Breaking News Reporting with that citation.

Still at the Courant in 2006, she wrote stories on military mental health care which won national awards. She and Matthew Kauffman were finalists for the Investigative Reporting Pulitzer, citing "their in-depth reports on suicide among American soldiers in Iraq, leading to congressional and military action to address mental health problems raised in the stories."

In 2002, she was one of a few American journalists to visit and report from Saudi Arabia. In December 2010, she co-founded the Connecticut Health Investigative Team, a non-profit investigative news service focusing on health and safety.

On January 12, 2018, Chedekel died at age 57 from cancer, leaving two children, Bernard and Evelyn, and her wife, Isabel Morais.

Awards
 2007 finalist, Pulitzer Prize for Investigative Reporting
 2006 George Polk Award
 2006 Selden Ring Award for Investigative Reporting
 2006 Worth Bingham Prize
 1999 Pulitzer Prize for Breaking News Reporting

Works
"Military Psychiatric Screening Still Lags,"  Hartford Courant, Matthew Kauffman, Lisa Chedekel, March 9, 2008

See also

References

2018 deaths
American investigative journalists
Place of birth missing
1960 births
Phillips Academy alumni
Wesleyan University alumni
People from Andover, Massachusetts
Writers from Boston
Hartford Courant people
Boston University people
George Polk Award recipients
Pulitzer Prize for Breaking News Reporting winners
American lesbian writers
LGBT people from Massachusetts
21st-century American women writers